The Humphrey pump is a large internal combustion gas-fuelled liquid-piston pump. They were used for large-scale water supply projects. They were only popular for a short time, from around 1910 to the outbreak of World War I, but they continued in service for a long period afterwards, some lasting into the 1970s.

The pump was invented by H. A. Humphrey, MIMechE. It was described in a paper presented by him to the Institution of Mechanical Engineers on 19 November 1909. A pump capable of pumping 250,000 gallons per hour to a head of 35 feet was exhibited at the 1910 Brussels Exhibition, where it was awarded two Grands Prix, for both engines and pumps.

Operation 

The pumps are an internal-combustion fluidyne engine. Although fluidynes are now considered to be a form of the external combustion Stirling engine, the Humphrey pump was an early example of one using internal combustion. A fluidyne has few moving parts: although they may include various valves, their key feature is that a mass of liquid acts as their piston, rather than the more usual mechanical piston. They are normally used for pumping liquids and use the pumped liquid as its own piston.

Humphrey's pump consists of a large U-shaped tube, filled with water. One end is sealed by a heavy cast iron 'combustion head'. The combustion head contains the inlet and exhaust valves, the ignition source and withstands the pressure of the combustion chamber. Water enters the pump through sprung inlet valves below the combustion chamber. A distinctive feature of the Humphrey pump, compared to others, is that the water only has to flow through this single set of valves: there are no non-return outlet valves, only the inertia of the delivered water within the outlet pipe is used to control its flow. As there are no delivery valves opening and closing suddenly, the water flow changes smoothly, avoiding water hammer and the usual problems for this type of pump.

Combustible gas, mixed with air, is supplied into the combustion chamber and then fired by an electric spark. The force of the expanding gas drives water downwards from the combustion chamber and accelerates it along the delivery pipe. Once the chamber pressure drops to that of the inlet water, the delivered water is no longer being accelerated but the large mass of water in the long pipe continues to flow by its own inertia. This reduces the pressure in the chamber below atmospheric, which causes the inlet air and gas valves to open, drawing in fresh air as a scavenging effect. As the water begins to flow back down the U, this increases the chamber pressure and causes the exhaust valves to open.

The engines were fuelled by producer gas, generated on site. This could be produced from wood, as at Cobdogla, or from coal.

Ignition was electric, by spark plug. As there was no moving shaft on which to mount a magneto, the high tension current was supplied by a trembler coil.

Four-stroke and two-stroke cycles 
The Humphrey pump could operate with either a four-stroke or two-stroke cycle.  Their normal operation was a four-stroke cycle. This required mechanical interlocks to the inlet valves, so that the exhaust and scavenge valves open once during the cycle to allow scavenging of the exhaust, but not during the compression cycle afterwards. A two-stroke cycle was also possible, if adequate scavenging could be achieved. The air trapped within the combustion chamber of a Humphrey pump has two roles: both for combustion and also as an air spring to maintain the oscillating water column. As this spring action involves a large volume of air, relative to the minimal air needed for combustion, the air cools easily to below the ignition temperature to pre-ignite the next charge. There would still be a risk of inefficient four-stroking though, unless the scavenging is effective enough to sweep out the previous exhaust gases. This was done by using a tall, thin combustion chamber so that the combustion air remained roughly isolated from the majority of the chamber's air and so was scavenged through the exhaust valves first. There was no separate scavenge air valve.

The two-stroke offered efficiency advantages. As the charge compression was carried out by the more powerful first compression stroke, a higher compression ratio was achieved, giving better efficiency. Despite this, the two-stroke design does not appear to have been used commercially.

Limitations and advantages
The first limitation of the Humphrey pump is that it has no suction capacity, in fact it must be installed in a dry sump several metres below the supply level. Given the pump's physical size and the need to protect the equipment against flood events, this is no small engineering exercise, requiring (in the Cobdogla example) several thousand tonnes of concrete. Also, it has a maximum lift of only around 10 metres. Its usual fuel, producer gas, contains very high levels of carbon monoxide, from which staff and visitors need to be protected in the event of accidental leakage. It is due to this concern that the Cobdogla demonstrations were halted.

Its advantages however are: with no moving parts except for the dozens of spring-loaded inlet valves, it has low maintenance and high reliability. It is also quite efficient, consuming roughly half the fuel compared with a pump driven by a mechanical gas engine doing the same work.

Installed pumps 

Few completed installations of Humphrey pumps are known and described:

King George V Reservoir, near Chingford in East London, had four Humphrey pumps installed when the pumping station was first constructed in 1912. Each pump was capable of pumping 40,000,000 gallons of water per day. A fifth, smaller, pump was added later. These were built by Beardmore's of Glasgow.

A single 66" diameter pump was installed at Del Rio, Texas in 1914. This was constructed by the Humphrey Gas Pump Co. of Syracuse, NY, who had licensed the Humphrey patents.

A very large drainage and irrigation plant for Egypt was also considered in 1914. Construction of this was disrupted, owing to the outbreak of World War I. It was originally to use eighteen pumps, each delivering 100,000,000 gallons per day to a head of 20 feet. Each pump chamber was to be 8 ft 8 in in diameter and 14 ft high. Final construction used ten pumps, five by Beardmore's and five by the Italian division of Brown Boveri.

These were constructed by Beardmore's in Glasgow and shipped out to Australia for assembly.

A 36" cylinder bore engine was installed at Chester, Pennsylvania installed in 1927 by the Sun Shipbuilding and Dry Dock Company.. It was designed as a 2-stroke engine to operate in a range of head from 20 to 150 ft (6 to 46 m) . The engine was installed in a 18ft 6 (5.6 m) diameter and 50 ft (15.25 m) deep steel caisson. about 40 ft below the Delaware river Air was supplied to the engine at this depth through a compressor. The pump supplied the shipyard and underwent endurance tests 8 hrs a day in 1925 – 27 before switching to 24 hrs a day with water at head of 150 ft for weeks in 1928.

Surviving examples 
The Chingford pumps were replaced by electric pumps in the 1970s, although three of the pumps remain in situ.

Cobdogla's pumps ran from 1927 to 1965. In 1985 one was restored as a working example and was awarded an IMechE Engineering Heritage Award.

The construction of a working model of a Humphrey pump was completed in 2008 and the model was demonstrated at various open days at UK museums.

Similar pumps 
A similar pump, the Joy pump, was also described at around the same time. This was much smaller, around six inches in diameter rather than six feet, and also had much smaller water pipe connections to it. This reduced water mass also reduced the compression ratio available in the combustion chamber, leading to reduced efficiency. The pump's ability to work with a suction lift of a few feet, rather than needing to be submerged like the Humphrey pump, was a convenience though. This pump was thought to have some application for small-scale or portable tasks, where its convenience outweighed efficiency.

Engines based on the Humphrey cycle 

Some designs feature a rotor or a turbine operating between two cylinders. The concept is to convert the oscillation of the liquid column between the two cylinders into rotation. Kress obtained US patent 3,135,094 for such an engine with an eccentric rotor. Abulnaga obtained patent 607796 in Australia in 1991 for an internal combustion liquid piston engine with a Darrieus type turbine rotating between two cylinders.

Sun et al. analyzed the features of the Humphrey/Atkinson cycle and showed that it can be more efficient than the Otto cycle under certain conditions. They proposed its use to analyze the new generation of wave disk engines.

Gallery

See also 
 Hydraulic ram
 Pulsometer pump

Notes

References

External links
 Cobdogla Irrigation and Steam Museum, South Australia

Further reading 

 P.D.Dunn, N.G.Joyce, D.J.Fulford, "The Humphrey Pump", A Report to the Ministry of Overseas Development, Department of Engineering and Cybernetics, University of Reading. January 1977.
 
 

Liquid-piston pumps
Gas engines
Free-piston engines
Pumps